Christopher Guy Landon (29 March 1911 – 26 April 1961) was a British novelist and screenwriter best known for the novel Ice Cold in Alex and its subsequent film adaption.

Biography
Landon was born in West Byfleet, Surrey. His father was a stockjobber of Huguenot descent and he was a distant cousin of the author Perceval Landon. He was educated at Lancing College and Clare College, Cambridge where he studied medicine.

Landon served with the Royal Army Medical Corps and Royal Army Service Corps in North Africa during the Second World War. Granted a field commission, Landon ended the war as a Captain and was granted an honorary promotion to Major when he relinquished his commission in 1951.

After the war he wrote several novels including A Flag in the City, a fictional account of British intelligence destroying German fifth column operations in Persia; Stone Cold Dead in the Market; Hornet's Nest; Dead Men Rise Up Never; and Unseen Enemy (also known as The Shadow of Time).

He died of accidental alcohol and barbiturate poisoning at his home in Frognal in 1961, leaving a wife and three children.

References

External links
 

1911 births
1961 deaths
People from West Byfleet
British writers
People educated at Lancing College
Royal Army Service Corps officers
Royal Army Medical Corps soldiers
British Army personnel of World War II
Alcohol-related deaths in England
Drug-related deaths in England
Barbiturates-related deaths